Dissophora is a genus of fungi in the Mortierellaceae family of the Zygomycota. The genus is widespread in north temperate regions and contains three species. Dissophora was circumscribed by American mycologist Roland Thaxter in 1914.

References

External links

Zygomycota genera